is a Japanese footballer who plays as a midfielder for J2 League club Blaublitz Akita.

Club career
Tanaka signed for Júbilo Iwata from Kansai University in January 2013. Then on 20 March 2013 Tanaka made his professional debut for Iwata against Omiya Ardija in the J. League Cup at the NACK5 Stadium Omiya in which he came on in the 76th minute for Kosuke Yamamoto as Iwata won the match 2–0.

National team career
Tanaka represented the Japan U-17 national team at the 2007 U-17 World Cup in which he played one match against France on 25 August 2007 in which he played 82 minutes as Japan's lost the match 2–1.

Club statistics
Updated to end of 2022 season.

References

External links

Profile at Ehime FC

1990 births
Living people
Kansai University alumni
Association football people from Osaka Prefecture
Japanese footballers
Japan youth international footballers
J1 League players
J2 League players
Júbilo Iwata players
V-Varen Nagasaki players
Ehime FC players
Blaublitz Akita players
Association football midfielders